Ontario School District 8C (OSD) is a school district headquartered in Ontario, Oregon.

The district is entirely in Malheur County.

History

Previously students at Four Rivers Community School, a charter school, were allowed to join extracurricular teams at District 8C campuses, but the district ended this in 2016. Hunter Marrow of the Argus Observer reported that this caused massive controversy.

In 2021 Nicole Albisu, the superintendent, reported fatigue in the district's faculty.

In 2022 three board members voted to retain Nicole Albisu as superintendent while two voted against doing so.

Schools
 Secondary
 Ontario High School
 Ontario Middle School

 Elementary
 Aiken Elementary School
 Alameda Elementary School
 Cairo Elementary School
 Pioneer Elementary School
 May Roberts Elementary School

References

External links
 

Ontario, Oregon
School districts in Oregon
Education in Malheur County, Oregon